Chinamerem Igboeli (born 5 May 2004) is a Nigerian footballer who currently plays as a forward for Ifeanyi Ubah.

Career statistics

Club

Notes

References

2004 births
Living people
Sportspeople from Onitsha
Nigerian footballers
Association football forwards
Nigeria Professional Football League players
Ifeanyi Ubah F.C. players